Border Security: Canada's Front Line is a former Canadian reality television series that aired from 2012 to 2014. The series, produced by Force Four Entertainment for National Geographic Channel Canada, was a Canadian adaptation of the Australian reality series Border Security: Australia's Front Line and depicted the work of Canada Border Services Agency officers at airports, land crossings, and international mail centres.

The CBSA claimed that the show was an educational tool to educate audiences about its duties and activities, but the series was controversial during its airing. Critics of the show claimed it was exploitative to film people in vulnerable situations, and that persons being detained by immigration officers could not properly give informed consent to being filmed. Border Security was ultimately cancelled following a ruling by the Privacy Commissioner of Canada that the CBSA had breached the privacy rights of a Mexican construction worker by allowing his interrogation to be filmed.

Broadcast
Season 1 premiered in Canada on Thursday, September 6, 2012 and season 2 premiered on August 27, 2013. New episodes in seasons 1 and 2 aired on National Geographic Channel, with reruns airing on Global and DTour. Season 3 premiered on September 5, 2014 at 10 pm. On October 31, 2014, National Geographic announced that Season 3 will be the show's last.

Episodes also air on DMAX in Italy as Airport Security Canada, Seven Network in Australia as Border Security: International with narration by Eden Falk, ProSieben Maxx in Germany as Border Patrol Canada, Discovery MAX in Spain as Control de Aduanas Canadá Universo (TV channel) in the United States and on Pick in the UK.

Controversy
The show was criticized after filming a March 2013 immigration raid where eight workers were arrested. Criticisms included the lack of informed consent for those filmed and that the filming constituted an invasion of privacy. Also at issue was the government's involvement in the show as then-Minister of Public Safety Vic Toews had approved filming.

Some defended the show for realistically portraying many of the agency's mandates, including deterrence for undocumented immigrants while at the same time displaying the ongoing professionalism of the CBSA officers. The situation was discussed in Parliament during an exchange between the NDP Public Safety Critic, Randall Garrison, and Vic Toews, where Toews defended the show.

A campaign to cancel the show was started: a group of 175 artists and a group of 92 community organizations each published open letters denouncing the show, an online petition calling for the show to be cancelled received over 20,000 signatures, and the BC Civil Liberties Association filed a complaint with the Canadian Privacy Commissioner.

As a result of the controversy, the show's producers chose to not air the footage that had drawn criticism, the Canada Border Services Agency (CBSA) updated the sign indicating that filming was occurring to better describe how consent for filming is obtained and the CBSA limited filming sites. The procedure for obtaining informed consent from participants has also been clarified. Although Luc Portelance, president of the CBSA, recommended in October 2013 that the show should be cancelled, the show was renewed for a third season by Public Safety Minister Steven Blaney.

Mexican national Oscar Mata Duran, who was arrested in the raid, filed a complaint with the Canadian Privacy Commissioner after being filmed by the series and presented with a filming consent form. The Canadian Privacy Commissioner found that the CBSA breached the Privacy Act by filming Duran before he was advised of the purposes of filming and found that the coercive nature of being held in a detention facility would have prevented Duran from providing informed consent for his appearance.

The Privacy Commissioner ruling prompted the CBSA to end its participation in the series at the end of Season 3. CBSA spokesperson Esme Bailey announced the series would not return for a fourth season. Because it can easily be partitioned off to fill a short-notice time slot due to its short-length segments, repeats of the series continue to air across Corus Entertainment networks, mainly as a filler program meeting Canadian content regulations.

Locations
Most of the episodes in seasons 1 and 2 were filmed at Vancouver International Airport, the land crossings at BC 99 (Peace Arch) and BC 15 (Pacific Highway), and marine points of entry in British Columbia.  Portions of season 2 were also filmed at Toronto Pearson International Airport and the Peace Bridge (QEW). In Season 3, the number of locations expanded with the inclusion Montréal–Pierre Elliott Trudeau International Airport and of land checkpoints in Alberta.

Following a ruling by the Privacy Commissioner of Canada, the CBSA stopped allowing Force Four to film the series in Canada. Season 4 focused on American border security, namely the U.S. Customs and Border Protection agency.

Episodes
Episodes typically have five or more segments; the first two to appear are described here to allow identification of the episodes

References

External links
 National Geographic Channel (Canada) show page

Television series by Force Four Entertainment
National Geographic (American TV channel)
2012 Canadian television series debuts
2014 Canadian television series endings
2010s Canadian reality television series
Television series by Corus Entertainment
Borders of Canada
Non-fiction works about law in Canada
Works about law enforcement in Canada
Television series about border control